The Jane Addams Children's Book Award is given annually to a children's book published the preceding year that advances the causes of peace and social equality.  The awards have been presented annually since 1953. They were previously given jointly by the Women's International League for Peace and Freedom (WILPF) and the Jane Addams Peace Association, but are now presented solely by the Jane Addams Peace Association.

History
The Jane Addams Children's Book Award was originally awarded to one book per year without categories. A Picture Book category was added in 1993; the award is currently given to two books annually, one for older children and one for younger children. In 2003, the time of year the award is given changed from September, honoring Jane Addams' birthday, to April, honoring the WILPF's birthday.

In the sixty-plus years of the award’s history, there has been one public controversy over the selection of its winner.  In 1970, the award was given to The Cay by Theodore Taylor, a book which became highly criticized in the years since its publication.  In 1974, the current award chair, who was not the chair at the time the award was given to The Cay, publicly stated that she thought it was a mistake to have named The Cay an Addams Award winner.  In response, Taylor, who saw the work as "a subtle plea for better race relations and more understanding," returned the Award "by choice, not in anger, but with troubling questions."  In later years, Taylor reported that the Award had been rescinded.  Even though The Cay remains on the list of Addams Award winners, Taylor's claim is widely thought to be true and has become a part of reading and discussing the book with young people today.

Recipients

References

External links
 Official site
 List of winners

American children's literary awards
Peace awards
Awards established in 1953
Women's International League for Peace and Freedom